Danielle Licari is a French singer who was active in the 1960s and 1970s. She's now remembered primarily as the vocalist in Concerto pour une Voix.

Career 
In 1964, she dubbed the singing in the movie The Umbrellas of Cherbourg for the role of Geneviève Emery, played by Catherine Deneuve.

From 1965 to 1967 she sang in the vocal trio Les Fizz with Jackie Castan and Nadine Doukhan, two other ex-Djinns Singers. Backed by Jacques Denjean's orchestra, the band released three EP.

In 1968, she recorded "Treize jours en France", composed by Francis Lai; she also recorded a second version of "Love Story" dedicated to her by the same composer.

In 1969, she recorded her greatest hit, "Concerto pour une Voix". The album has sold over 15 million copies.

In 1972, she submitted her song "Au cœur d'une chanson" to compete in the Eurovision contest representing France. The French committee selected Betty Mars and her song "Come-Comedie" instead.

In 1972, she represented France in the "World Popular Song Festival" held in Tokyo, Japan. Her song "Une Vie" was a finalist.

In 1973, she participated as a vocalist to an album considered as a masterpiece of French chanson: the symphonic, dark and epic Il n'y a plus rien (There is nothing anymore) by singer-songwriter Léo Ferré.

In July 1978, she sang with the Quebec Symphony Orchestra and the choir of St-Dominique Church. The piece chosen was a musical drama called Concerto pour Helene, in honour of Helene Boule, the wife of the founder of Quebec City, as part of the city's 370th anniversary celebrations. The work was composed by Claude Léveillée.

In 1982, she voiced Princess Aurora in the French dub of Sleeping Beauty.

Wyclef Jean sampled "Concerto Pour Une Voix" in his 1997 song "Apocalypse."

She has sold over 20 million copies of her albums during her career. Her songs are found in easy listening CD compilations worldwide.

Singing style
Her characteristic singing style lacked lyrics, communicating emotions through sounds, the way a violin would. This may have fueled her popularity in non-French speaking countries like Germany, Spain, Mexico, Brazil, Japan and Korea. She used her voice like a musical instrument giving a soft, unique dream-like tone. She has been called la voz de la sirena ("the voice of a Siren"). Most of her recordings are arrangements of classical themes composed originally for instruments rather than voice, while the arrangements consist generally of large orchestral ensembles mixed with a pop-rock band instrumentation. She incorporated pop-rock elements that made her music appealing. Her singing style influenced Japanese Anime soundtracks of the 1980s such as Seiji Yokoyama (Saint Seiya).

Discography

Studio albums

Backing vocals 
Danièle Licari also sang for other artists, such as French singer-songwriter Léo Ferré.

Singles

Collections 

The Greatest Hits (Universal). Distributed in Latin America, Spain, France, Canada, the United States, Japan, Korea and many more
The Best Collection of World Popular Music: Pops and Vocals, Volume 5. (PolyGram Records)
1981: Double compilation – Concerto pour une voix (Pro-Culture, Canada only)
1993: Master Série (PolyGram)
1994: Best of Best (RCA Victor, Japan only)
1999: Concerto pour une Voix – compilation CD (RCA Victor, Japan only)

Soundtracks 
1964 – The Umbrellas of Cherbourg (While parts of the melody are used throughout the movie, the full song "Devant le Garage" is sung by the character Geneviève Emery, played by Catherine Deneuve and dubbed by Danielle Licari)
1971 – The Deadly Trap (singing voice)
1981 – J'en ai rêvé ("Once Upon a Dream") in Disney's second French version of Sleeping Beauty (first was released by Huguette Boulangeot)
1985 – Asterix et la surprise de Cesar

References 
daniellelicari.com

External links 
 

Living people
French women singers
Year of birth missing (living people)